This is a list of the origins of the names of provinces of Bulgaria.

References

See also 
 Provinces of Bulgaria
 Bulgarian placename etymology

 Province

Lists of place name etymologies
Provinces
Province name etymologies
Provinces